In computational complexity theory, NP/poly is a complexity class, a non-uniform analogue of the class NP of problems solvable in polynomial time by a non-deterministic Turing machine. It is the non-deterministic complexity class corresponding to the deterministic class P/poly.

Definition
NP/poly is defined as the class of problems solvable in polynomial time by a non-deterministic Turing machine that has access to a polynomial-bounded advice function.

It may equivalently be defined as the class of problems such that, for each instance size , there is a Boolean circuit of size polynomial in  that implements a verifier for the problem.

Applications
NP/poly is used in a variation of Mahaney's theorem on the non-existence of sparse NP-complete languages. Mahaney's theorem itself states that the number of yes-instances of length  of an NP-complete problem cannot be polynomially bounded unless P = NP.
The same computational hardness assumption that co-NP is not a subset of NP/poly also implies several other results in complexity such as the optimality of certain kernelization techniques.

References

Complexity classes